Theodard (Thiatbraht) was Bishop of Utrecht from around 784 to around 790.

It is believed that because of his name Théodard, like his predecessors Gregory and Alberic, he was related to the Carolingian house. There is nothing known of his administration.

In Vienna there is a 6th-century Livy manuscript written with a note from the 8th century: Codex iste est episcopi Theutberti the Dorestat (translation: this book is owned by Theutbert, bishop of Dorestad).

Further reading
Dekker, C., history of the province of Utrecht, Utrecht, 1997
Dick Block, The Netherlands Franconia, Haarlem, 1979

Bishops of Utrecht
8th-century Frankish bishops
8th-century deaths
Year of birth unknown